The Battle of Arroyo Grande was a battle between the Luso-Brazilian forces under the command of Bento Manuel Ribeiro, and  the Artiguist forces of Fructuoso Rivera in Arroyo Grande, modern-day Uruguay. 
The Luso-Brazilian forces were completely victorious.

Consequences
After the Luso-Brazilian success in Arroyo Grande, a great number of Artiguist soldiers and officers defected and joined them, due to the fact they were promised forgiveness and mercy. This, together with the battle itself, was a severe blow to Artigas' war effort.

References

Arroyo Grande 1818
Arroyo Grande 1818
Arroyo Grande 1818
1818 in Portugal
1818 in Brazil
1818 in Uruguay
October 1818 events